The Depot Rail Museum is a museum in Troutdale, Oregon, United States. The building houses the Gateway to the Gorge Visitor Center.

See also

 Depot Park

References

External links
 
 Depot Rail Museum at Troutdale Historical Society
 Depot Rail Museum Renovation Project, City of Troutdale
  (October 24, 2016), Pamplin Media

Museums in Oregon
Railway museums
Troutdale, Oregon